Bob Proctor (born Robert Corlett Proctor; July 5, 1934 – February 3, 2022) was a Canadian self-help author and lecturer. He was best known for his New York Times best-selling book You Were Born Rich (1984) and being a contributor to the film The Secret (2006). Proctor's teachings maintained the idea that a positive self-image is critical for obtaining success, frequently referencing the pseudoscientific belief of the law of attraction.

Proctor's teachings were a major contributor to the rise in prominence of the law of attraction, chiefly because of You Were Born Rich and The Secret. Some experts worried that individuals may opt for Proctor's model of Positive Thinking instead of physical therapies or medical intervention. A response to these criticisms and concerns is that positive self-image is the foundation for a positive action, not the action itself.

The law of attraction originates from quantum mysticism which suggests that positive thinking can shape reality. Critics say that quantum mysticism cannot be connected to quantum mechanics without drawing upon "coincidental similarities of language rather than genuine connections".

Life and career

Early years
Proctor claimed to have a poor self-image and little ambition as a child, dropping out from Danforth Tech after a bandsaw-inflicted thumb injury left him with no plans for the future. However, in the early 1960s, Ray Stanford shared the book Think and Grow Rich with him. Soon afterward, Proctor claimed his life started to change as the book shifted his focus in life. Proctor said he started a company offering cleaning services as his first enterprise - a venture, he claimed, netted him over $100,000 in his starting year despite having neither formal education nor business experience.

You Were Born Rich and The Secret
Proctor later joined the Nightingale-Conant Organization and worked his way up within the company, claiming to have been mentored by Earl Nightingale. 

In 1984, the book You Were Born Rich was published by McCrary Publishing. Prior to that, other publishers rejected it, noting that "this book is absurd." Australian-based filmmaker Rhonda Byrne discovered his book, leading her to request Proctor participate in the 2006 movie The Secret. Financial experts express caution from not making sound investments when following the advice of You Were Born Rich.

Personal life and death
Proctor died on February 3, 2022, at the age of 87.

Law of attraction
Throughout his material, Proctor aimed to have the reader tap into their "inner self". He suggested the reader's "inner-self" controls all that is brought into their life and that a bad self-image, which he called a "paradigm", will lead to poor results even among those with adequate knowledge and abilities.  

Despite no evidence supporting the law of attraction, Proctor contended that everything in the universe vibrates and that similar vibrations attract each other. Using images of Kirlian photography, Proctor further argued that a person's body emitted an "energy field" and that the mind and body vibrate at specific frequencies which, if harnessed, could produce specific results. He suggested that given humans are capable of controlling their thoughts, they could choose to manipulate these vibrational frequencies and thus control their outcomes by attracting objects which vibrate at a similar frequency. Critics claimed Proctor's teachings were a pseudoscientific misunderstanding of quantum mechanics. In response, Proctor claimed his teachings were "the basic laws of the universe". 

Proctor claimed there was nothing in a person's life they could not change through the law of attraction. Proctor also suggested that even a global recession was the result of excessive vibrational negativity which attracted the recession to the economy. In a 2009 article, The Wall Street Journal opined that if any of Proctor's followers believed that they could simply choose not to participate in the recession they were "being shammed".

References

1934 births
2022 deaths
Canadian finance and investment writers
Canadian motivational writers
Canadian self-help writers
Writers from Toronto